In enzymology, a nucleoside-triphosphatase (NTPase) is an enzyme that catalyzes the chemical reaction

NTP + H2O  NDP + phosphate

Thus, the two substrates of this enzyme are NTP and H2O, whereas its two products are NDP and phosphate.

This enzyme belongs to the family of hydrolases, specifically those acting on acid anhydrides in phosphorus-containing anhydrides.  The systematic name of this enzyme class is unspecific diphosphate phosphohydrolase. Other names in common use include nucleoside triphosphate phosphohydrolase, nucleoside-5-triphosphate phosphohydrolase, and nucleoside 5-triphosphatase.  This enzyme participates in purine metabolism and thiamine metabolism.

Structural studies

As of late 2007, only one structure has been solved for this class of enzymes, with the PDB accession code .

References

 
 
 

EC 3.6.1
Enzymes of known structure